Jesse Benjamin Stoner Jr. (April 13, 1924 – April 23, 2005) was an American lawyer, white supremacist, neo-Nazi, segregationist politician, and domestic terrorist who perpetrated the 1958 bombing of the Bethel Baptist Church in Birmingham, Alabama, but was not convicted for the bombing of the church until 1980.

He was a founder and the long-time chairman of the National States' Rights Party as well as the publisher of its newsletter, The Thunderbolt. Stoner campaigned for several political offices as a Southern Democrat in order to promote his white supremacist agenda. He also founded his own white supremacist party.

Early life
Stoner's family ran a sight-seeing company on Lookout Mountain, Georgia, as well as in nearby Chattanooga. At age two, he contracted childhood polio, which impaired one of his legs and resulted in a lifelong limp. His father Jesse Benjamin Stoner Sr., died when he was five; his mother Minnie died when he was 17.

Career
Stoner admired segregationist politician Theodore G. Bilbo. He  became active in white supremacist groups and traveled to Washington, D.C. to support Bilbo.

Stoner rechartered a chapter of the Ku Klux Klan in Chattanooga when he was 18 years old. Stoner once said that "being a Jew [should] be a crime punishable by death." He ran the National States' Rights Party, founded by Edward Reed Fields, an associate of Stoner's, which attracted such fringe political figures as Addison Roswell Thompson, a perennial Democratic candidate for governor of Louisiana and mayor of New Orleans.

Stoner received a law degree from Atlanta Law School in 1952. He served as the attorney for James Earl Ray, the assassin of Martin Luther King Jr. The Federal Bureau of Investigation (FBI) suspected that Stoner was also involved in the assassination of Martin Luther King Jr. as well as bombings of several synagogues and black churches during the 1950s and 1960s, such as the 16th Street Baptist Church bombing.

He lived at 591 Cherokee Street in "Old" Marietta, Georgia.

As a "roving white supremacist," Stoner, along with Connie Lynch, was present in Bogalusa, Louisiana in 1965, performing the same road show to inflame white mobs in St. Augustine during the summer of 1964.

Stoner ran for governor of Georgia in 1970. During the campaign, where he called himself the "candidate of love," he described Adolf Hitler as "too moderate," described black people as an extension of the ape family, and described Jews as "vipers of Hell." The primary was won by civil rights movement supporter, and future president, Jimmy Carter. Stoner then ran for the United States Senate in 1972, finishing fifth in the Democratic Party primary with just over 40,000 votes. The nomination and the election both went to Sam Nunn.

During his Senate campaign, the Federal Communications Commission (FCC) ruled that television stations had to play his racist ads because of the fairness doctrine. Stoner also ran for lieutenant governor in 1974 and he also ran for a seat in the US Senate in 1980. His best showing was 73,000 votes (10%) in his campaign for lieutenant governor in 1974, when he sought to succeed Lester G. Maddox in Georgia's second- highest constitutional office. That year, Maddox lost the gubernatorial nomination to former legislator George D. Busbee.

In his 1974 campaign for lieutenant governor, Stoner placed signs on the Macon Transit Company buses, which Mayor Ronnie Thompson ordered the removal of. Stoner promptly went to federal court to secure the return of his paid signs under his First Amendment protection. He urged, tongue-in-cheek, Georgia blacks to support his nemesis, Thompson, for governor. Stoner polled more votes for lieutenant governor than were cast for all four candidates in the Republican gubernatorial primary, which Thompson had only barely won.

In 1978, Stoner ran in the Democratic gubernatorial primary and polled 37,654 votes (5.4℅).

Bethel Baptist Church bombing

Stoner was a suspect in the 1958 bombing of the Bethel Baptist Church, but he was not indicted for it until 1977. In 1980, a mostly white jury found him guilty and sentenced him to ten years in prison. Prosecutors suspected that Stoner perpetrated as many as a dozen other bombings attributed to the "Confederate Underground"; these included the attempted bombing of Temple Beth-El in Charlotte, North Carolina (1957), and the bombings or attempted bombing of Temple Emanuel in Gastonia, North Carolina (1958), the Nashville, Tennessee Jewish Community Center (1958), Temple Beth El in Miami, Florida (1958), the Jacksonville Jewish Center and a black elementary school (1958), Temple Beth-El in Birmingham, Alabama (1958), and The Temple in Atlanta (1958), and Congregation Anshai Emeth in Peoria, Illinois (1958). He was not prosecuted for any of those cases.

After he was convicted, Stoner appealed his conviction for three years, and when his appeals ran out, he lived in hiding as a fugitive for four months. In 1984, he was permanently removed from the roster of lawyers who may appear before the United States Supreme Court. Stoner was released from prison for good behavior in 1986, having served  years of his sentence. In 1990, Stoner ran for lieutenant governor again.

Later life
After his release from prison and until his death at the age of 81, Stoner lived at a nursing home in northwest Georgia, still defending his segregationist views. In one of his last interviews he stated, "A person isn't supposed to apologize for being right." His left side was partially paralyzed as the result of a stroke.  Stoner is buried at Forest Hills Cemetery in Chattanooga, Tennessee.

Works

Published works

Letters
Ephemeral materials, 198—by J B Stoner; Crusade Against Corruption. Wilcox Collection of Contemporary Political Movements, University of Kansas.

Audiovisual recordings

Stoner, J.B. & Erwin Saul. Interview with Sarah Kessler. J.B. Stoner and Erwin Saul comment on recent violence by the National States' Rights Party and similar organizations. Date unknown. .

References

1924 births
2005 deaths
1960 United States vice-presidential candidates
1964 United States vice-presidential candidates
20th-century American lawyers
20th-century far-right politicians in the United States
American neo-fascists
Georgia (U.S. state) Democrats
Georgia (U.S. state) lawyers
American Ku Klux Klan members
National States' Rights Party politicians
Neo-Nazi politicians in the United States
People convicted on terrorism charges
People from Walker County, Georgia
Neo-fascist terrorism
Neo-fascist politicians
Activists from Georgia (U.S. state)